Kusamakura is a compilation album by Italian singer-songwriter Alice, released in Japan in 1988 on EMI Music/Odeon Records. The album's title translates as Grass Pillow.

The compilation, which comprises tracks from studio albums Park Hotel  (1986) and Elisir (1987), also includes the rare previously unreleased recording "Le scogliere di Dover" ("The Reeves of Dover"), with which Alice participated in the World Popular Song Festival in Tokyo in 1988, only available on this album. The track would later be re-written, re-arranged and re-recorded for the 1989 album Il sole nella pioggia, then titled "I cieli del nord" ("The Skies of the North").

Track listing
Side A
"Viali di solitudine" (Francesco Messina, Marco Liverani) – 4:04
 From 1986 album Park Hotel 
"Il senso dei desideri" (Alice, Mino Di Martino, Saro Cosentino) – 4:12
 From 1986 album Park Hotel 
"Città chiusa" (Francesco Messina, Marco Liverani) – 4:21
 From 1986 album Park Hotel
"Hispavox" (Alice, Franco Battiato, Giusto Pio) – 5:03
 From 1987 album Elisir. 
"Le scogliere di Dover" (Alice, Marco Liverani) – 4:56
 Previously unreleased recording. Later re-recorded for 1989 album Il sole nella pioggia, then retitled "I cieli del nord".

Side B
"Luci lontane" (Francesco Messina, Alice) – 5:13
 From 1986 album Park Hotel
"Nuvole" (Alice, Tuni, Francesco Messina) – 5:13
 From 1987 album Elisir
"The Fool on the Hill" (John Lennon, Paul McCartney) – 3:32
 From 1987 album Elisir
"Nomadi" (Juri Camisasca) – 4:29
 From 1986 album Park Hotel
"Volo di notte" (Francesco Messina, Alice) – 5:07
 From 1986 album Park Hotel

Personnel
 Alice – lead vocals, keyboard instruments
 Jerry Marotta – drums, LinnDrum programming tracks A1, A2, A3, B1, B4 & B5
 Tony Levin – bass guitar, stick bass tracks A1, A2, A3, B1, B4 & B5
 Phil Manzanera – guitars tracks A1, A2, A3, B1, B4 & B5
 Michele Fedrigotti – keyboards, MIDI piano, tracks A1, A2, A3, B1, B4 & B5, keyboards, Korg digital piano, synthesizer bass tracks A4, B2, B3
 Pietro Pellegrini – Fairlight programming tracks A1, A2, A3, B1, B4 & B5
 Curt Cress – drums, percussion instruments tracks A4, B2, B3
 Filippo Destrieri – keyboards, computer and drum machine tracks A4, B2, B3 
 Marco Guarnerio – acoustic and electric guitars tracks A4, B2, B3
 Francesco Messina – keyboard programming tracks A4, B2, B3
 Marco Liverani – keyboards tracks A4, B2, B3

Production
 Francesco Messina – record producer, musical arranger
 Alice – musical arranger tracks A1, A2, A3, B1, B4 & B5
 Michele Fedrigotti – musical supervision tracks A1, A2, A3, B1, B4 & B5
 Recorded at Lark Studio, Carimate tracks A1, A2, A3, B1, B4 & B5 
 Allan Golberg – sound engineer tracks A1, A2, A3, B1, B4 & B5
 Jim at Logic Studio, Milan – assistant sound engineer tracks A1, A2, A3, B1, B4 & B5
 Benedict Tobias Fenner – assistant sound engineer tracks A1, A2, A3, B1, B4 & B5
 Mauro Stokmajer – technical assistance tracks A1, A2, A3, B1, B4 & B5
 Fabio Montaldi – technical assistance tracks A1, A2, A3, B1, B4 & B5
 Mixed by Benedict Tobias Fenner at Logic Studio, Milan 
 Marco Liverani – musical arranger tracks A4, B2, B3
 Marco Guarniero – collaborator musical arrangements tracks A4, B2, B3
 Michele Fedrigotti – musical supervisor tracks A4, B2, B3
 Benedict Tobias Fenner – sound engineer tracks A4, B2, B3
 Tracks A4, B2, B3 Recorded and mixed at Logic Studio Milan in September and October 1987 
 CDG Milano – digital editing tracks A4, B2, B3
 Mastered at Abbey Road Studios, London tracks A4, B2, B3
 Polystudio & EMI Creative Service – cover design 
 Gik Piccardi – cover photography
 Gioi Ardessi – make-up
 Alessandro Paderni – photography

External links

1988 compilation albums
Alice (singer) albums
EMI Records albums
Italian-language albums